Stelis apposita is a species of orchid plant native to Ecuador.

References 

apposita
Flora of Ecuador
Plants described in 2001